Allan Roy Edwards (March 12, 1937 – August 16, 1999) was a Canadian professional ice hockey goaltender who played 236 games in the National Hockey League with the Detroit Red Wings and the Pittsburgh Penguins between 1967 and 1973. Internationally he played for the Canadian national team at the 1958 World Championships, winning the gold medal.

Playing career
In 1958, at age 21, Edwards backstopped the Whitby Dunlops, Canada's representative, to the World Championships at Oslo, Norway. He posted a perfect 7–0 record in the eight-team round-robin tournament. In those seven games, Edwards played every minute. He recorded three shutouts and allowed six total goals to have an 0.86 goals-against average.

In 1960 he became property of the Chicago Black Hawks. His name was engraved on the Stanley Cup in 1961 even though he never played a single game for Chicago.

Edwards' road to the NHL was a long, winding one. In nine years, he played for seven teams in four leagues. On June 6, 1967 the Pittsburgh Penguins selected him in the expansion draft, but traded him to the Detroit Red Wings the very next day.

In 1967–68, Roger Crozier, the Red Wings' first-string goaltender, retired due to illness, and Edwards was called upon to take his place. He led the team in games and wins for four consecutive seasons.

A collision in 1970 with an opposing forward and the goalpost caused a hairline fracture in Edwards' skull, and this caused him headaches and dizzy spells. His health caused him to retire, but only briefly. He made a comeback with the Pittsburgh Penguins, and after one season there he returned to the Wings. He had his best season in 1972–73: he won 27 games and led the NHL with six shutouts. The following season, he lost his first three games and retired for good.

Personal life
Edwards was the uncle of Don Edwards, also an NHL goalie.

Career statistics

Regular season and playoffs

International

External links
 
 Obituary at LostHockey.com

1937 births
1999 deaths
Buffalo Bisons (AHL) players
Calgary Stampeders (WHL) players
Canadian ice hockey goaltenders
Detroit Red Wings players
Ice hockey people from Ontario
Pittsburgh Hornets players
Pittsburgh Penguins players
Portland Buckaroos players
Ontario Hockey Association Senior A League (1890–1979) players
Sault Thunderbirds players
St. Catharines Teepees players
Spokane Comets players
Stanley Cup champions
Sportspeople from Haldimand County